Kalwakurthy Assembly constituency is a constituency of Telangana Legislative Assembly, India. It is one of four constituencies in Nagarkurnool district and one of the eight constituencies in Ranga Reddy district. It is part of Nagarkurnool Lok Sabha constituency.

Gurka Jaipal Yadav of Telangana Rashtra Samithi won the seat with majority of 3447 in the 2018 Assembly election.

NT Rama Rao, founder of the Telugu Desam Party, lost from this constituency when he was defeated by Chittaranjan Das of Congress in 1989 elections.

Mandals
The Assembly Constituency presently comprises the following mandals:

Members of Legislative Assembly

Election results

Telangana Legislative Assembly election, 2018

Election results

Telangana Legislative Assembly election, 2014 

Kalwakurthy Assembly Election (1989)

See also
 List of constituencies of Telangana Legislative Assembly

References

Assembly constituencies of Telangana
Mahbubnagar district